is an English land law case, concerning easements. It concerns physically shared amenities with physically divided ownership as to the land or surface on which they rest.

Facts
Constructed in 1907, numbers 56 and 58 in a semi-detached housing estate were built with a path between them, giving access from a road to the back gardens. The boundary between the two was the mid line of the path. On 14 May 1976 the estate owners sold number 56 to the tenants under the Leasehold Reform Act 1967 section 8 i.e. the lessees (tenants) exercised their rights to leasehold enfranchisement (purchase the freehold underlying their house). The tenants had not required an express right of way be included under LRA 1967, section 10(3)(a). In October 1976 number 58 was also enfranchised. In 2003, the occupants of number 56 sued number 58 for a right of way.

The learned judge at first instance rejected the claim that any right appertained to number 56 under the Law of Property Act 1925, section 62(2) because there was no evidence the path was used for gaining access to the back garden at the time of the conveyance. But he accepted an easement over the path should be implied into the 14 May 1976 conveyance under Wheeldon v Burrows because it was necessary for reasonable enjoyment.

Judgment
Chadwick LJ held that there was no difficulty in implying into each lease the grant and reservation of reciprocal rights to share the pathway.

The alternative type of implied easements, under Wheeldon v Burrows, did not apply where between the land conveyed and that retained, there was common ownership, but not common occupation. There needed to be both. Hence it is inapplicable to standard leasehold enfranchisement.

See also

English land law
English trusts law
English property law

References

English land case law
Court of Appeal (England and Wales) cases
2006 in case law
2006 in British law